Hespereburia blancheti is a species of beetle in the family Cerambycidae. It was described by Dalens and Tavakilian in 2009.

References

Hesperophanini
Beetles described in 2009